Air Staff may refer to:

Staff (military), a body of senior officers in a military service:
Air Staff (Sweden), former body of senior officers that ran the Swedish Air Force
Air Staff (United Kingdom), the body of senior officers that runs the Royal Air Force
Air Staff (United States), the body of senior officers that runs the United States Air Force

See also
Chief of the Air Staff (disambiguation)